Edmund Pytts ( – 24 November 1753) was a British Tory politician, MP for Worcestershire 1741–1753.

Pytts was the son of Samuel Pytts  and Frances Sandys, the daughter of Samuel Sandys . He matriculated at Balliol College, Oxford in 1713, aged 16. Pytts stood unsuccessfully at Ludlow in 1727. He was elected MP for Worcestershire in 1741, and re-elected unopposed in 1747. A Tory, he voted against the government in all recorded votes.

Personal life
On 24 January 1727, Pytts married Susanna, daughter of Jonathan Collet. She died on 2 April 1742. They had four sons and four daughters, including Edmund Pytts . On 12 December 1752, he married Anne, daughter of Sir Streynsham Master and widow of Gilbert Coventry, 4th Earl of Coventry.

Death 
He died on 24 November 1753.

References

1690s births
1753 deaths
Alumni of Balliol College, Oxford
British MPs 1741–1747
British MPs 1747–1754
Tory members of the Parliament of Great Britain
Members of the Parliament of Great Britain for Worcestershire